Klostermann Block, also known as the Alliance Building, is a historic commercial building located at Cape Girardeau, Missouri.  It built in 1905, and is a two-story, rectangular brick, building measuring 100 feet by 75 feet.  It features a cornice and frieze of pressed metal.

It was listed on the National Register of Historic Places in 1996.

References

Commercial buildings on the National Register of Historic Places in Missouri
Commercial buildings completed in 1905
Buildings and structures in Cape Girardeau County, Missouri
National Register of Historic Places in Cape Girardeau County, Missouri
1905 establishments in Missouri